Clash of the Titans was a concert tour co-headlined by American thrash metal bands Megadeth and Slayer, which took place in September and October 1990 and again from May to July 1991. Launched in support of their respective albums Rust in Peace and Seasons in the Abyss, the tour had two legs, first in Europe (supported by Testament and Suicidal Tendencies) and second in the United States (tri-headlined by Megadeth, Slayer and Anthrax and supported by Alice in Chains). Clash of the Titans is considered one of the most successful tours in heavy metal history, and bridged the gap between the popularity of thrash metal and rise of the alternative rock and grunge scene.

History
The tour began in the fall of 1990 with a three-week European leg featuring Megadeth, Slayer, Testament and Suicidal Tendencies, promoting their then-current albums Rust in Peace, Seasons in the Abyss, Souls of Black and Lights...Camera...Revolution! respectively.

A second leg in 1991 in the United States and Canada had a slightly different lineup: Megadeth, Slayer and Anthrax headlined, and Alice in Chains supported; while Megadeth and Slayer were still promoting their respective albums Rust in Peace and Seasons in the Abyss, Anthrax was supporting their fifth studio album Persistence of Time and Alice in Chains was touring behind their debut album Facelift.

Alice in Chains was not originally on the bill for the U.S. tour. According to the documentary Get Thrashed, Death Angel was to be the supporting act – however, after a near-fatal tour bus crash, they were forced to bow out. Sepultura was also mooted for the tour, but, according to then-frontman Max Cavalera, "got kicked out", and instead embarked on the New Titans on the Block tour with Sacred Reich, Napalm Death and Sick of It All. Anthrax guitarist Scott Ian stated in an interview with Guitar World that they wanted Pantera as the opening act of the Clash of the Titans tour. Other bands, such as Exodus, Vio-lence, Kreator and Obituary, also reportedly declined to take part in the tour as the opening act.

About the tour, Ian recalled, "We didn't start making any money until 1991, on the Clash of the Titans tour in the States – not even a dime. I got home from that tour to receive a cheque for a sizeable amount and called my accountant, saying, 'There must be a mistake.' We were of Iron Maiden's style of mindset, where we had to have these huge stage sets, and everything went straight back into the band."

Interesting to note is that Metallica was the only "big four" of thrash metal act that did not take part in the Clash of the Titans tour. Slayer guitarist Kerry King told Guitar World that, "There might have even been talk of a 'Big Four' tour back then, but we probably couldn't get Metallica onboard. But we had three pieces of it, and that was all the management and promoters needed." The members of Slayer, Megadeth and Anthrax have indicated that one of the reasons Metallica was not part of the Clash of the Titans tour was due to their ascension to popularity, specifically with their self-titled "black album", which was not released until five weeks after the tour's conclusion. King has been quoted as saying, "I knew Metallica wouldn't be a part of it 'cause they didn't need us."

Spin-offs
On November 16, 2009, it was announced that the European Clash of the Titans lineup would be reunited after nineteen years on the American Carnage Tour, featuring Slayer, Megadeth and Testament. On July 13, 2010, a second leg of the American Carnage Tour was announced that would feature the American Clash of the Titans lineup: Megadeth, Slayer and Anthrax. Neither Suicidal Tendencies nor Alice in Chains were featured in either lineup.

Possible revival
On December 9, 2017, Ultimate-Guitar.com reported that a rebooted Clash of the Titans tour featuring Megadeth, Slayer, Testament and Sepultura was in the works, and scheduled to take place in 2018 or 2019 in support of new albums from these four bands. More speculation about a tour similar to Clash of the Titans was renewed in January 2018, when Megadeth frontman Dave Mustaine mentioned a potential tour featuring Exodus and three of the "big four" (Megadeth, Slayer and Anthrax); a month later, Mustaine tweeted another potential tour similar to Clash of the Titans, titled "The New Big 4", featuring Megadeth, Anthrax, Exodus and Testament.

When Slayer announced their farewell tour in January 2018, it was suggested that the recently-rumored Clash of the Titans tour (also featuring Megadeth, Sepultura and Testament) would take place as part of the aforementioned tour. Although Mustaine cryptically denied that this tour was in the works, he stated in a June 2018 interview with Rock Talk With Mitch Lafon that, "I hope that Megadeth and Slayer get to go one more round somewhere. I think it would be great, especially if it was a 'Big Four' show, but that's entirely up to them. And if it doesn't happen, we've had our share of Slayer and Megadeth shows, and I'll always appreciate those times together." Testament frontman Chuck Billy also commented on the tour rumors, referring to Slayer's farewell tour, "I doubt it, this is Slayer's last tour so this is it. There will be no more Slayer tours."

When asked in August 2018 by CBS San Francisco about the possibility of a revival of the Clash of the Titans tour with Slayer and Megadeth, Anthrax bassist Frank Bello stated, "I wouldn't say it's under wraps because I don't know about it. But I would absolutely love for the Big 4 thing to happen again. That would be the right thing to do for everybody. I would love that. I mean, as far as Slayer goes, I'm sure they're going to do more shows next year, but I don't know if we'll be on them, because we do have our album to write. It's all about scheduling and agents and all that. But we'd be open to any of that, specifically the Big 4. I think all four bands that were involved with the Big 4 would love to do it again. But that's totally up to Metallica."

In August 2019, the website Metal Addicts reported that a 30th anniversary edition of the Clash of the Titans tour was rumored to be taking place in 2020 and would feature a different lineup, with Megadeth and Testament likely to be included, but added that Slayer was not expected to be on the bill due to their farewell tour, which ended in November 2019. When asked a month later by The Metal Voice what the odds were for the revival of the Clash of the Titans tour and their European tour with Testament and Exodus—The Bay Strikes Back, Death Angel frontman Mark Osegueda commented: "The revival of the Clash of the Titans one, that's of course out of our hand. I've seen, some rumors floating around everywhere of course, we've not been approached so I could not tell you that, you know, I've heard anything. We've not been approached as a band as far as the Bay Strikes Back to tour that's happening in February–March in Europe."

Tour dates

Cancellations

Setlist 

Megadeth Setlist 1990
 "Rattlehead"
 "Wake Up Dead"
 "Hangar 18"
 "Hook in Mouth"
 "Skull Beneath the Skin"
 "The Conjuring"
 "In My Darkest Hour"
 "Devil's Island
 "My Last Words"
 "Peace Sells"
 "Holy Wars... The Punishment Due"
 "Good Mourning/Black Friday"
 "Liar"
 "Anarchy in the U.K." (Sex Pistols cover)

Megadeth Setlist 1991
"Wake Up Dead"
"Hook In Mouth"
"Hangar 18"
"The Conjuring"
"In My Darkest Hour"
"Dawn Patrol"
"Tornado of Souls"
"Holy Wars... The Punishment Due"
"Peace Sells"
"Anarchy in the U.K." (Sex Pistols cover)

Slayer Setlist 1990
"Raining Blood"
"Black Magic"
"War Ensemble"
"Postmortem"
"Blood Red"
"Die by the Sword"
"Dead Skin Mask"
"Altar of Sacrifice"
"Jesus Saves"
"At Dawn They Sleep"
"Spirit in Black"
"Mandatory Suicide"
"Live Undead"
"South of Heaven"
"Angel of Death"

Slayer Setlist 1991
"Hell Awaits"
"The Antichrist"
"War Ensemble"
"South of Heaven"
"Raining Blood"
"Altar of Sacrifice"
"Jesus Saves"
"Dead Skin Mask"
"Seasons in the Abyss"
"Mandatory Suicide"
"Angel of Death"

Anthrax Setlist
"Efilnikufesin (N.F.L.)"
"Got the Time" (Joe Jackson cover)
"Caught in a Mosh"
"Keep It in the Family"
"Indians"
"Antisocial" (Trust cover)
Encore:
"I'm the Man"
"Won't Get Fooled Again" / "I Am the Law"

Personnel

Megadeth
Dave Mustaine – guitars, vocals
Marty Friedman – guitars
David Ellefson – bass
Nick Menza – drums
Slayer
 Tom Araya – bass, vocals
 Kerry King – guitars
 Jeff Hanneman – guitars
 Dave Lombardo – drums
Testament
 Chuck Billy – vocals
 Alex Skolnick – lead guitar
 Eric Peterson – rhythm guitar
 Greg Christian – bass
 Louie Clemente – drums

Suicidal Tendencies
 Mike Muir – vocals
 Rocky George – lead guitar
 Mike Clark – rhythm guitar
 Robert Trujillo – bass
 R. J. Herrera – drums
Anthrax
 Joey Belladonna – lead vocals
 Dan Spitz – lead guitar
 Scott Ian – rhythm guitar
 Frank Bello – bass
 Charlie Benante – drums
Alice in Chains
 Layne Staley – vocals
 Jerry Cantrell – guitars
 Mike Starr – bass
 Sean Kinney – drums

References and notes

Footnotes

Notations
 Clash of the Titans article from Spin
 Jerry Cantrell discusses 1990 Clash of the Titans and later tour with Ozzy Osbourne on Blabbermouth.net

1990 concert tours
1991 concert tours
Anthrax (American band) concert tours
Heavy metal concerts
Heavy metal festivals
Megadeth concert tours
Slayer concert tours
Testament (band) concert tours
Co-headlining concert tours
Rock festivals in the United States